Milo Donal O'Shea (2 June 1926 – 2 April 2013) was an Irish actor. He was twice nominated for the Tony Award for Best Actor in a Play for his performances in Staircase (1968) and Mass Appeal (1982).

Early life
O'Shea was born and brought up in Dublin and educated by the Christian Brothers at Synge Street school, along with his friend Donal Donnelly. His father was a singer and his mother a ballet teacher. Because he was bilingual, O'Shea performed in English-speaking theatres and in Irish in the Abbey Theatre Company. At age 12, he appeared in George Bernard Shaw's Caesar and Cleopatra at the Gate Theatre. He later studied music and drama at the Guildhall School in London and was a skilled pianist.

He was discovered in the 1950s by Harry Dillon, who ran the 37 Theatre Club on the top floor of his shop the Swiss Gem Company, 51 Lower O'Connell Street Dublin. Early in his career O'Shea toured with the theatrical company of Anew McMaster.

Career
O'Shea began acting on the stage, then moved into film in the 1960s. He became popular in the United Kingdom, as a result of starring in the BBC sitcom Me Mammy alongside Yootha Joyce. In 1967–68 he appeared in the drama Staircase, co-starring Eli Wallach and directed by Barry Morse, which stands as Broadway's first depiction of homosexual men in a serious light. For his role in that drama, he was nominated for the Tony Award for Best Actor in a Play in 1968.

O'Shea starred as Leopold Bloom in Joseph Strick's 1967 film version of Ulysses. Among his other memorable film roles in the 1960s were the well-intentioned Friar Laurence in Franco Zeffirelli's Romeo and Juliet and the villainous Dr. Durand Durand (who tried to kill Jane Fonda's character by making her literally die of pleasure) in Roger Vadim's counterculture classic Barbarella (both films were released in 1968). In 1984, O'Shea reprised his role as Dr. Durand Durand (credited as Dr. Duran Duran) for the 1985 Duran Duran concert film Arena (An Absurd Notion), since his character inspired the band's name. He played Inspector Boot in the 1973 Vincent Price horror/comedy film Theatre of Blood.

He was active in American films and television, such as his memorable supporting role as the trial judge in the Sidney Lumet-directed movie The Verdict (1982) with Paul Newman, an episode of The Golden Girls in 1987, and portraying Chief Justice of the United States Roy Ashland in the television series The West Wing. In 1992, O'Shea guest starred in the season 10 finale of the sitcom Cheers, and, in 1995, in an episode of the show's spin-off Frasier. In the episode of Frasier, he played Dr. Schachter, a couple's therapist who counsels the Crane brothers together. He appeared in the pilot episode of Early Edition as Sherman.

Other stage appearances include Mass Appeal (1981) in which he originated the role of "Father Tim Farley" (for which he was nominated for the Tony Award for Best Actor in a Play in 1982), the musical Dear World in which he played the Sewer Man opposite Angela Lansbury as Countess Aurelia, Corpse! (1986) and a 1994 Broadway revival of Philadelphia, Here I Come.

O'Shea received an honorary degree from Quinnipiac University in 2010.

Personal life
O'Shea's first wife was Maureen Toal, an Irish actress, with whom he had two sons, Colm and Steven. He divorced her in 1974.

He was married to the Irish actress Kitty Sullivan, whom he met in Italy, where he was filming Barbarella and she was auditioning for Man of La Mancha. The couple occasionally acted together, such as in a 1981 Broadway revival of My Fair Lady. O'Shea and Sullivan had no children together. They both adopted United States citizenship and resided in New York City, where they both lived from 1976.

Death
O'Shea died on 2 April 2013, in New York City following a short illness at the age of 86.

Filmography

Film

Television

Theatre

Awards & Nominations

References

External links
 
 
 
 Obituary in The Irish Times

1926 births
2013 deaths
Irish male film actors
Irish emigrants to the United States
Irish male television actors
Irish male stage actors
Male actors from Dublin (city)
Male actors from New York City
People educated at Synge Street CBS
Quinnipiac University people